The 1919 Sam Houston Normal football team represented Sam Houston Normal Institute (now known as Sam Houston State University) as an independent  during the 1919 college football season. Led by fifth-year head coach Gene Berry, Sam Houston compiled an overall record of 0–7.

Schedule

References

Sam Houston Normal
Sam Houston Bearkats football seasons
College football winless seasons
Sam Houston Normal football